Mark Fallon is a former Naval Criminal Investigative Service special agent and counter-terrorism expert from the United States.
He was the director of the Criminal Investigative Task Force at the US Military's Guantanamo detention camp, for two and half years, where his organization conducted a parallel and independent series interrogations and intelligence analysis from that conducted by Joint Task Force Guantanamo, the CIA and the FBI.

Fallon tried to use his influence to prevent torture from being employed at Guantanamo. According to Ben Taub, writing in the New Yorker magazine, by August 2002 "Fallon's élite interagency criminal-investigation task force had been sidelined."

Following his time in Government service Fallon became a vocal critic of the US Intelligence Establishment's counter-terrorism efforts.

On 2008 Fallon joined The Soufan Group, a security firm founded by Ali Soufan, a former FBI counter-terrorism expert who also became a critic of the narrative common from members of the US Intelligence Establishment.

In 2017 Fallon published "Unjustifiable Means: The Inside Story of How the CIA, Pentagon, and US Government Conspired to Torture."  Fallon said that he faced significant resistance from the government in publishing his book, including extended delays and censorship of 113 passages, often for information that was already part of the congressional record. Department of Defense spokesman Darrell Walker disputed claims the Government was trying to suppress publication of his book.  Rather, he said, the Government imposed delays were due to his book requiring review from ten different Government agencies.

The American Civil Liberties Union mounted a defense of Fallon's First Amendment right to free speech, and contacted several members of Congress.

Fallon and Maria Hartwig, a psychologist at John Jay College of Criminal Justice at City University of New York,  are developing a training curriculum for investigators based in actual science related to lying and deception.

References

Naval Criminal Investigative Service agents
United States Marshals
Living people
Year of birth missing (living people)